is the Japanese form of the language of flowers. The language was meant to convey emotion and communicate directly to the recipient or viewer without needing the use of words.

Flowers and their meanings

See also
Language of flowers

Plant symbolism

References

Language of flowers
Japanese culture
Japanese words and phrases